Soumik Datta (born c. 1983) is a Bengali-born British Indian musician and composer, who specialises in the sarod. He was born in Mumbai and brought up in London. His brother is the photographer and filmmaker Souvid Datta.

Sons of banker father Soumilya and writer/art-house film director mother Sangeeta Datta, Soumik and Souvid Datta both attended Harrow School and Soumik was trained in the sarod by Pandit Buddhadev Das Gupta, whom he called "grandfather". He went on to University College London, then studied at Trinity Laban Conservatoire of Music and Dance, graduating in 2009 with an MMus in Composition. In 2006 he was invited by Jay-Z to play at the Royal Albert Hall and he subsequently performed on stage with Beyoncé, but declined an offer to join her on tour. 

Soumik Datta contributed to the musical scores of the films Brick Lane (2007), Life Goes On (2009), and Gangs of Tooting Broadway (2013).

In 2017 he curated a festival of music and dance at the Horniman Museum in London.  In the same year, he presented Tuning 2 You: Lost Musicians of India, a documentary directed by his brother Souvid.

In June 2019, Datta performed at the Glastonbury Festival. Later in the year he was signed by Bucks Music Group.

Albums
Fretless (2009)
Circle of Sound (2012) (with Bernhard Schimpelsberger)
Anti-Hero (2014)
King of Ghosts (2019)
Jangal (2019)
''Silent Spaces' (2021)

References

Indian musicians
Sarod players
Living people
1980s births
Year of birth uncertain